Ashley Kriel (17th October , 1966 - July 9th , 1987) was a South African anti-apartheid activist who was killed by police in Cape Town on 9 July  1987 for his role in advocating anti-apartheid actions. In 1999, Jeffrey Benzien was granted an amnesty by the South African Truth and Reconciliation Commission for his part in the killing.

On his release from prison in February 1990, Nelson Mandela acknowledged Ashley Kriel's sacrifice for the anti-apartheid struggle in his speech in Paarl.

In his memory, the Institute for Justice and Reconciliation and the University of the Western Cape created the annual Ashley Kriel Memorial Youth Lecture  to highlight youth leadership challenges throughout the country.

Death and funeral
The circumstances around Kriel's death have never been clearly established. According to Benzien, a security policeman known for his "wet-bag" torture of activists, he was shot by accident during a scuffle. However, forensic scientist David Klatzow believes Kriel was shot from a distance while handcuffed. His sister Michel returned to the house and found blood in numerous places, inside and outside, including on a spade, and believes he was tortured. In spite of the doubts around Benzien's testimony, he was granted amnesty by the Truth and Reconciliation Commission.

Kriel's funeral was attacked by South African police with tear gas.

The Ashley Kriel Youth Leadership Development Project
The project was established because of the inspiration from Cape Town youth leader Ashley Kriel who was killed by the apartheid regime in the 1980s.  He is recognised as representative of students and youth of the 1980s from the Cape Flats in the Western Cape. Ashley Kriel is a symbol of youths bringing about social change in and out of the Western Cape.
 
The program involves youth in many various platforms, including physical and electronic, the project also promotes debate about youth leadership and development.  By connecting a cross-section of youth from different societies, the project aims to develop young future leaders.

Memory Box Initiative
Projects are combined to focus on the fostering of conversation and the sharing of personal narratives and community histories in Worcester, as means of furthering reconciliation and the impact on the IJRs Ashley Kriel Youth Leadership Development Project and Schools' Oral History.

The project aims to provide a platform whereby stories of community members in Worcester can be explored through different aspects of Arts and Theatre-based activities that create space for dialogue, peace-building, social justice and public participation.

The key element throughout the projects is the closing of the generational gap between youth and generations from different eras within the community's history, including the former anti-apartheid activists with the aim of encouraging the connection between the two eras by sharing experiences and memories.

References

1987 deaths
Anti-apartheid activists
South African democracy activists
People from Cape Town
South African activists
Assassinated activists
Extrajudicial killings in South Africa
Prisoners who died in South African detention
Deaths in police custody in South Africa
People shot dead by law enforcement officers in South Africa
Cape Coloureds
1967 births
Reconciliation